Borello is an Italian surname. Notable people with the surname include:

 Giuseppe Borello (born 1999), Italian footballer
 Fernando Borello (born 1980), Argentine sports shooter
 Francesco Borello (1902–1979), Italian footballer
 José Borello (1929–2013), Argentine footballer

See also
 Borrello, town in Abruzzo, Italy
 Borrello (surname)

Italian-language surnames